Judgement 2009 was a professional wrestling event promoted by DDT Pro-Wrestling (DDT). It took place on April 5, 2009, in Tokyo, Japan, at the Korakuen Hall. It was the thirteenth event under the Judgement name. The event aired domestically on Fighting TV Samurai.

Storylines
Judgement 2009 featured seven professional wrestling matches that involved different wrestlers from pre-existing scripted feuds and storylines. Wrestlers portrayed villains, heroes, or less distinguishable characters in the scripted events that built tension and culminated in a wrestling match or series of matches.

Event
The dark match saw DJ Nira defeat Mammoth Handa and Yoshiaki Yago to earn a spot in the main event. However, after the match, Nira informed Sanshiro Takagi that he had a broken wrist and that he wouldn't be able to compete. Takagi asked Handa if he was up to the task but Handa refused as well because he believed he had injured his ribs. Yago then asked if he could take the spot but Takagi refused and locked him up in a locker.

Danshoku Dino teamed with Yoshihiko, an inflatable love doll, to defeat Piza Michinoku and Antonio Honda from the Italian Four Horsemen stable. During the match, Yoshihiko was "killed" by a Honda knee drop, which caused its head to burst open, and was replaced by a second Yoshihiko, who was also a love doll, only modified to resemble the Great Muta.

The next match was a tag team match featuring Akira Taue and Genba Hirayanagi from Pro Wrestling Noah (Noah).

Next, Kota Ibushi faced Taiji Ishimori from Noah.

The main event was a Rumble rules battle royal in which the winner won an opportunity to challenge the then KO-D Openweight Champion Sanshiro Takagi at Max Bump 2009, on May 4. Moreover, an envelope containing a championship match contract was suspended above the ring, giving whoever would grab it first the right to challenge a champion of their choosing at any time, in a similar fashion to WWE's Money in the Bank contract. Yoshiaki Yago, having freed himself from the locker, was the first to grab the contract before being eliminated. Harashima eventually won the match by last eliminating Big Japan Pro Wrestling's Daisuke Sekimoto.

Results

References

External links
The official DDT Pro-Wrestling website

2009
2009 in professional wrestling
Professional wrestling in Tokyo